Mark Yee (born January 4, 1982) is a Filipino professional basketball player for the Sta. Rosa Laguna Lions of the Pilipinas Super League.

PBA career statistics

Correct as of September 24, 2016

Season-by-season averages

|-
| align=left | 
| align=left | Burger King
| 15 ||	19.5 || .483 || .387 || .800 || 3.9 ||	1.4 ||	.1 ||	.4 ||	8.8
|-
| align=left | 
| align=left | Burger King / Talk 'N Text
| 42 ||	14.1 || .392 || .343 || .627 || 2.5 ||	.7 ||	.3 ||	.4 ||	5.2
|-
| align=left | 
| align=left | Talk 'N Text
| 23 ||	5.0 || .469 || .273 || .750 || .7 ||	.4 ||	.0 ||	.0 ||	2.7
|-
| align=left | 
| align=left | Meralco
| 18 ||	11.4 || .377 || .231 || .875 || 1.4 ||	.7 ||	.1 ||	.2 ||	3.3
|-
| align=left | 
| align=left | GlobalPort
| 31 ||	14.7 || .420 || .250 || .727 || 3.1 ||	.5 ||	.2 ||	.1 ||	4.2
|-
| align=left | 
| align=left | GlobalPort
| 19 ||	13.6 || .397 || .333 || .909 || 2.5 ||	.6 ||	.2 ||	.2 ||	3.2
|-
| align=left | 
| align=left | Kia
| 20 ||	16.9 || .500 || .286 || .684 || 4.3 ||	.6 ||	.2 ||	.1 ||	5.0
|-
| align=left | 
| align=left | Mahindra
| 35 ||	16.1 || .442 || .231 || .831 || 4.9 ||	.7 ||	.7 ||	.6 ||	6.7
|-class="sortbottom"
| align=center colspan=2 | Career
| 203 || 13.9 || .432 || .301 || .759 || 3.0 ||	.7 ||	.3 ||	.3 ||	4.9

References

External links
Yee PBA.ph profile

1982 births
Living people
Barako Bull Energy players
Basketball players from Negros Occidental
Terrafirma Dyip players
Filipino men's basketball players
NorthPort Batang Pier players
Meralco Bolts players
Power forwards (basketball)
Small forwards
TNT Tropang Giga players
College basketball players in the Philippines
Maharlika Pilipinas Basketball League players